Thomas Fry (1666 – 3 September 1748) was a deputy governor of the Colony of Rhode Island and Providence Plantations.  The son of Thomas and Mary Fry of Newport and East Greenwich in the Rhode Island colony, he was a glazier by trade.  He became a freeman of East Greenwich in 1690, aged about 24, and began a long career of civil service in 1696 when he became a deputy, serving in that role during most years over a period of three and a half decades.  From 1698 to 1704 he was Justice of the Peace, he later served as Clerk of the Assembly for several years, and he was Speaker of the House of Deputies for ten years between 1713 and 1730.  In 1707 he was appointed one of the commissioners to settle with Massachusetts the northern boundary of Rhode Island, and two years later he was appointed to a committee to run lines between the two colonies.  In 1715, he and Andrew Harris were appointed by the Assembly to transcribe and to prepare for the press all the laws of the colony, and in 1719 he was allowed ten pounds for his efforts to get the laws printed.

In 1727 he was selected to complete the term as Deputy Governor of Jonathan Nichols who had died in office.  He served under Joseph Jenckes who had just taken office the same year, and then was selected for the same position in 1728 for another year.  He died in 1748, leaving a very large estate valued at more than 22,000 pounds, which included black slaves that were conveyed in his will to his unmarried daughters.  His wife was Welthian Greene, daughter of Thomas and Elizabeth (Barton) Greene, niece of Deputy Governor John Greene, Jr., and granddaughter of John Greene who was a co-founder of the town of Warwick, Rhode Island.

See also

 List of lieutenant governors of Rhode Island
 List of colonial governors of Rhode Island
 Colony of Rhode Island and Providence Plantations

References

Bibliography

Further reading

External links
State list of lieutenant governors of Rhode Island

1666 births
1748 deaths
American people of English descent
People from East Greenwich, Rhode Island
People of colonial Rhode Island